The New York Athletic Club Rugby Football Club is a rugby union team based in New York City that is affiliated with the New York Athletic Club.

Sponsorship
American Rugby Premiership

Club honors
 Rugby Super League Champions: 2005, 2008, 2010, 2012
US Men's Division I National Champions: 2014
American Rugby Premiership Champions: 2016
 US Men's Division I National Championship Runner-up: 2001
 US Men's 7s National Championship: 6th in 2000
 7s North East Regional Champions: 2000

Notable players and coaches

NYAC was coached from 2000-2011 by Mike Tolkin, who also served as the defensive coach (2009-2011 & RWC 2011) and Head Coach (2012-2015 & RWC 2015) for the United States national rugby team  
Former coach Bruce McLane is a regular contributor to Ruggermatrix and current head coach of Iona College.

Phil Bailey, a former rugby league professional and current USA men's national team 15s defensive coach, took over as head coach for the 2014/2015 season. Phil was assisted by another former professional, Neil McMillan. Neil spent time with Ulster, Harlequins, and Sale before moving to New York.

USA Eagles

Past and current Eagles include:
Alexander Magleby – hooker (7s), flanker (15s), 2004 7s captain, coach of the US national rugby sevens team
Mike Petri – starting scrumhalf for the Eagles during the 2011 Rugby World Cup
Brian Doyle
Louis Stanfill – starting flanker for the Eagles during the 2011 Rugby World Cup
Dan Power
Matt Wyatt
Jacob Sprague
Justin Hundley (7s)
 Toby L'Estrange
 Chris Chapman
 Tom Coolican
 Troy Hall
 Derek Asbun
Seamus Kelly
Al MacFarland
AJ MacGinty
Nate Brakeley
James Aldridge

References

External links

New York Athletic Club
Rugby union teams in New York City
Rugby union teams in New York (state)
Rugby clubs established in 1973